NBA Friday is a weekly presentation of National Basketball Association games on ESPN. Formerly known as NBA Friday Coast to Coast during doubleheader nights, the program starts the first Friday of the NBA season, and typically runs uninterrupted throughout the entire season. In 2006, NBA Friday was preempted from March 10 to March 31, due to ESPN deciding against counter programming the NCAA Tournament. Nearly all NBA Friday telecasts consist of a doubleheader, with one game typically from the east coast at 7:30 p.m and the west coast at 10:00 p.m.

The KIA NBA Shootaround Pregame Show, the Toyota Halftime Show, and the Target Postgame Show are the studio shows that occur before, during, and after the NBA Friday Games.

NBA Friday on ESPN is not exclusive; local sports networks may still air the game in their market. In that case, the ESPN broadcast on these markets is subject to blackout and SportsCenter is usually aired instead.

Announcers

Notable games
December 6, 2002 - The Los Angeles Lakers come back from a 30-point deficit (including a 28-point fourth quarter deficit) to defeat the then 17–1 Dallas Mavericks .
January 17, 2003 - The first meeting between then-Los Angeles Laker Shaquille O'Neal and then-Houston Rockets rookie Yao Ming. The game was the second highest rated NBA game on cable ever at the time.
January 31, 2003 - NBA legend Michael Jordan plays his final game in Chicago, Illinois as the Washington Wizards play the Chicago Bulls. The game airs on ESPN2, though ESPN pre-empted programming to air the starting lineups.
November 19, 2004 - Pacers–Pistons brawl.
February 10, 2012 - Jeremy Lin scored a career-high 38 points as the New York Knicks defeated the Los Angeles Lakers 92-85.

References
InsideHoops.com - ESPN NBA

ESPN original programming
2002 American television series debuts
2010s American television series
2020s American television series
Friday